Krapets is a coastal village in Shabla Municipality, Dobrich Province, northeastern Bulgaria.

Krapets Glacier on Danco Coast, Antarctica is named after the village.

References

External links

Villages in Dobrich Province
Populated coastal places in Bulgaria